Redlands Mall was a mall in Redlands, California with two anchors, CVS Pharmacy and Gottschalks. The mall, located on about 12 acres on Orange Street and Eureka Street between Redlands Boulevard and Citrus Avenue, was built in 1977. The mall permanently closed in 2010. The mall is scheduled for demolition and redevelopment in the fall of 2023.

History
The mall was planned in 1977 to revitalize the city of Redlands. After demolishing some stores and the La Posada Hotel, the mall was built by The Hahn Company. It offered more than 173,000 square feet of enclosed leasable space and a 12,586-square-foot freestanding retail building. It had two floors and contained a Sav-on Drugs store (which was re-branded to a CVS Pharmacy) and Harris'. The all cinder block brick design was criticized for not reflecting the design elements it replaced and its surrounding area. By the mid '90s the mall was showing signs of weakness with most popular stores being replaced by independent tenants.

In 1998, original tenant Harris' closed being replaced by Gottschalks shortly after since the Harris-Gottschalks acquisition took place that same year. The mall started struggling in the early 2000s when sales dropped to exceedingly low numbers. After only twelve years as a tenant, Gottschalks filed for bankruptcy in 2009 and closed all stores, including the Redlands Mall location. After struggling financially after the closure of Gottschalks, the closure of the mall was announced on September 30, 2010, by its owners, Howard Hughes and General Growth Properties. All leases were terminated.

Redevelopment
In July 2014, San Diego-based Brixton Capital LP, the private equity investment vehicle for BruttenGlobal, purchased the mall and announced plans to convert the mall to a mixed-use project with residential and retail development. Brixton later stated they would not develop the site unless it owned the entire lot as the deal did not include the city owned parking lot surrounding the mall. The City later sold the parking lot for $1.95 million to Brixton in 2017.

The Brixton developer abandoned its plans and sold the mall to Village Partners Inc. Newport Beach developer Village Partners purchased the property and announced their own redevelopment plans called  "State Street Village" in 2020. Plans include 700 high end apartments and condominiums, more than 12,000 square feet of office space and 72,000 square feet of street retail. Rooftop bars, pedestrian paseos, and a structured parking site. A 23,000 square foot private plaza and public art arch with a connection to West State Street shops. The developer states the design and make up of State Street Village would mirror and incorporate design elements common to Redlands. Spanish, Mediterranean, 19th century Victorian and craftsman styles. Mostly mimic the designs found east of the site, on east State Street. The local CVS store would move to a new purposely built building south of the mall site. The Dennys restaurant, Mattress store and bank have already moved out of the lot.

Local nimby opposition voiced their concern over height restrictions, apartments and the Arrow Metrolink train under construction. They opposed the multi level luxury style apartment designs and used corrosive language, describing them as "stack and pack" apartments. They even proposed a growth control ballot measure enacting height restrictions, Measure F. The mostly conservative minority was against transit villages being proposed in the city and statewide. Local leaders oppose the measure due to the California housing shortage needs. Measure F was soundly defeated by the voters in November 2022.

In May 2022 the City Council and Planning Commission approved the site developers plans. Village Partners stated they do not plan to go over three to four stories anyways and respect the downtown Redlands design elements to its Transit Oriented Development. Village Partners has stated demolition and construction would commence in the summer of 2023.

References

1977 establishments in California
Defunct shopping malls in the United States
Redlands, California
Commercial buildings completed in 1977